Doug Kramer Jr. (born June 4, 1998) is an American football center for the Chicago Bears of the National Football League (NFL). He played college football at Illinois and was drafted by the Bears in the sixth round of the 2022 NFL Draft.

College career
Kramer was ranked as a threestar recruit by 247Sports.com coming out of high school. He committed to Illinois on January 15, 2016 over offers from Ball State and Florida Atlantic.

Professional career
Kramer was drafted by the Chicago Bears with the 207th pick in the sixth round of the 2022 NFL Draft on April 30, 2022. He was placed on injured reserve on August 16, 2022.

References

External links
 Chicago Bears bio
 Illinois Fighting Illini bio

1998 births
Living people
People from Hinsdale, Illinois
Players of American football from Illinois
Sportspeople from Cook County, Illinois
Sportspeople from DuPage County, Illinois
American football offensive linemen
Illinois Fighting Illini football players
Chicago Bears players